The Richmond Public Library is the public library of Richmond, New Hampshire, United States. It is located in the Richmond School House No. 6 at 19 Winchester Road (New Hampshire Route 119) in the village center. Built in 1850, the building is the best-preserved of the town's few surviving district schoolhouses. It was listed on the National Register of Historic Places in 1980.

Description and history
The Richmond Public Library stands on the west side of the small village center of Richmond, on the north side of Winchester Road west of Old Homestead Road. It is a single-story wood-frame structure, with a gabled roof and clapboarded exterior. Its main facade is three bays wide, with sash windows in the left two bays, and the main entrance in the right one, sheltered by a gabled hood with large decoratively cut supporting brackets. A small ell extends to the right, and a larger one to the left, both the result of 20th-century alterations. The interior has been completely refurbished for library use, with pine paneling, dropped ceilings, and built-in shelving.

The school was the second to be built on the site, the first being a brick building which burned in 1850. This building was constructed later the same year, and served as a school until 1947. It was converted to library use in 1962. Alterations at that time and in 1974 included the removal of a belfry, the addition of an extension to the west (which included a below-grade fireproof vault for archives), and of the pedimented entrance cover.

See also
National Register of Historic Places listings in Cheshire County, New Hampshire

References

External links
Richmond Public Library

Libraries on the National Register of Historic Places in New Hampshire
School buildings completed in 1850
Libraries in Cheshire County, New Hampshire
Libraries established in 1962
National Register of Historic Places in Cheshire County, New Hampshire
Richmond, New Hampshire